The Bass-Morrell House is a historic mansion in Ardmore, Tennessee, U.S.. It was built in 1840 for John Bass, a landowner. It was designed in the Greek Revival architectural style. It was purchased by Jacob Morrell, the owner of the Elk River Grist Mills, in 1878. It has been listed on the National Register of Historic Places since November 10, 1988.

References

Houses on the National Register of Historic Places in Tennessee
Greek Revival houses in Tennessee
Houses completed in 1840
Houses in Giles County, Tennessee